Bea Pintens (born 30 August 1972) is a Belgian former short track speed skater. She competed at the 1992 Winter Olympics and at the 1994 Winter Olympics. In the 1994 Olympics, she was the  flagbearer for Belgium.

Bea Pintens is the older sister of fellow Belgian short track speed skater, Sofie Pintens who has also represented Belgium at the 1994 Winter Olympics

References 

1972 births
Living people
Belgian female short track speed skaters
Olympic short track speed skaters of Belgium
Short track speed skaters at the 1992 Winter Olympics
Short track speed skaters at the 1994 Winter Olympics